Ciołek's Missal is one of the oldest relics of Polish literature. Made in 1515, in Kraków, for Erazm Ciołek, the Archbishop of Płock it was decorated with figural initials, rich borders with motives of crests of the owner (Sulima Coat of Arms).

External links
 Mszał Erazma Ciołka 

1515 books
1515 in Europe
Illuminated missals
Medieval Polish literature
1510s in Poland
16th-century Christian texts
16th-century illuminated manuscripts